Tetramorium bicarinatum, is a species of ant of the family Formicidae in the order Hymenoptera that originated in South East Asia.

Morphology
It is a reddish headed medium-sized ant, with mesosoma and waist contrasting with a dark gaster.

Habitat
The species can adversely affect native biodiversity. It is also said to be a common tramp species which is usually found inside of houses, in greenhouses and shade houses, or in landscaped areas near houses.

Venom 
The Tetramorium bicarinatum's venom arrangement shows potential for a new pharmacologically active substance, bicarinalin. This antibacterial, antimicrobial, and anti-infective compound could potentially be chemically synthesized to combat antibiotic-resistant pathogens by means of drug therapy.

References

Further reading
Wetterer, James K. "Worldwide spread of the penny ant, Tetramorium bicarinatum (Hymenoptera: Formicidae)." Sociobiology 54.3 (2009): 811–830.
Astruc, Cyril, Christian Malosse, and Christine Errard. "Lack of intraspecific aggression in the ant Tetramorium bicarinatum: a chemical hypothesis." Journal of Chemical Ecology 27.6 (2001): 1229–1248.
de Biseau, J. C., et al. "Respective contributions of leader and trail during recruitment to food inTetramorium bicarinatum (Hymenoptera: Formicidae)." Insectes sociaux 41.3 (1994): 241–254.

External links

bicarinatum
Insects described in 1846
Taxa named by William Nylander (botanist)

Hymenoptera of New Zealand
Ants of New Zealand